The District of Lakeland No. 521 is a rural municipality (RM) in the Canadian province of Saskatchewan within Census Division No. 15 and  Division No. 5.

History 
The RM of Lakeland No. 521 was originally incorporated as a rural municipality on August 1, 1977. Its name was changed to the District of Lakeland No. 521 on June 1, 2011.

Geography

Communities and localities 
The following urban municipalities are surrounded by the RM.

Villages
 Christopher Lake

The following unincorporated communities are within the RM.

Organized hamlets
 Elk Ridge

Localities
 Anglin Lake
 Clearsand Beach
 Emma Lake
 Guise Beach
 McIntosh Point
 McPhail Cove
 McPhee Lake
 Murray Point
 Neis Beach
 Okema Beach
 Sunnyside Beach
 Tweedsmuir

Demographics 

Government 
The District of Lakeland No. 521 is governed by an elected municipal council and an appointed administrator that meets on the second Monday of every month. The reeve of the RM is Walter Plessl while its administrator is Tammy Knuttila. The RM's office is located in Christopher Lake.

Transportation 
 Saskatchewan Highway 2
 Saskatchewan Highway 263
 Saskatchewan Highway 952
 Saskatchewan Highway 953

See also 
List of rural municipalities in Saskatchewan

References

External links 

Lakeland

Division No. 15, Saskatchewan